USRC Gallatin was the name of more than one ship of the United States Revenue Cutter Service:

 , a cutter in commission from 1815 or 1816 until ca. 1824
 , a cutter in commission from 1830 to 1840 and from 1848 to 1849
 , also known as USRC Albert Gallatin, a cutter in commission from 1874 to 1892

See also
 , a cutter in commission with the Revenue Cutter Service from 1807; sunk in 1813
 , United States Coast Guard ships

United States Coast Guard ship names